is a Japanese comedian and actor who was a member of the comedy duo King of Comedy.

Konno lives in Saitama, Saitama.

Filmography

Drama

Variety

Films

Anime

Advertisements

Narration

Stage

Radio

Internet series

Mobile series

References

External links
 
 

Actors from Saitama Prefecture
Japanese male comedians
Japanese male film actors
Japanese male stage actors
Japanese male television actors
Japanese male voice actors
1978 births
Living people
21st-century Japanese male actors